Sundarmani Patel (born 6 September 1923) was an Indian politician. He was a Member of Parliament, representing Odisha in the Rajya Sabha the upper house of India's Parliament as a member of the Swatantra Party.

References

1923 births
Possibly living people
Rajya Sabha members from Odisha
Swatantra Party politicians